Eric Goodwin (6 March 1929 – 2012) was an English professional footballer who played in the Football League for Mansfield Town.

References

1929 births
2012 deaths
English footballers
Association football defenders
English Football League players
Coventry City F.C. players
Mansfield Town F.C. players